The Empress Dowager is a 1975 Hong Kong historical film directed by Li Han-hsiang and produced by the Shaw Brothers Studio, starring Lisa Lu as Empress Dowager Cixi.

Plot
Although the Empress Dowager Tzu-hsi of the Ching Dynasty had promised her nephew, Emperor Kuang-hsu that he had complete autonomy, he found that this was not the case as he attempted to exert his authority over corrupt eunuchs and officials who undermined him with the backing of the Empress Dowager. Young, inexperienced and without a strong cadre of loyal officials to support him, he tries to juggle affairs both public and private. His loveless marriage to Empress Chin Feng and dislike of the Empress further leaves him all the more bereft of any power lever. His only bright spark in a cold gloomy palace was his love for Concubine Chen and a young eunuch who wholeheartedly supports him.

Cast
Lisa Lu as Empress Dowager Tzu-hsi
Ti Lung as Emperor Kuang-hsu
Siu Yiu as Consort Zhen
Miao Tien as Eunuch Li Lien-ying
David Chiang as Eunuch Ko Lien-tsai
Ivy Ling Po as Empress Chin Feng
 as Li Chieh
Chen Ping as Consort Jin
Shum Lo as Eunuch Wang Shang
Cheung Ying as Tutor Weng Tung-ho
Ku Feng as Lord Li Hung-chang
Hao Li-jen as Prince Kung
Lee Pang-fei as Prince Shun
Cheng Miu as Official Yung Lu
Yeung Chi-hing as Official Hsu Tung
Wang Hsieh as Official Kang Li
Chiang Nan as Official Tai Yi
Ching Miao as Ronglu
Tin Ching as Cheng Yueh Lou
Ouyang Sha-fei as concubine
Law Bing-ching as Kiang governor's daughter
Chan Si-gai as Kiang governor's daughter
Wong San as court official
Liu Wai as court official
Wang Han-chen as court official
Kong Yeung as court official
Wong Ching-ho as eunuch in charge of conjugal record
Tung Wai as eunuch
Chan Mei-hua as lady in waiting
Lau Nga-ying as lady in waiting
Ofelia Yau as lady in waiting
Yuen Man-tzu as lady in waiting
Ling Hon as court official
Gam Yam as court official
Kwan Yan as court official
Fuk Yan-cheng as court official
Lui Hung as lady in waiting
Yeung Kei as lady in waiting
On Ching-man
Lau Wai-ling
So Chan
Shum Shuk-yee
Woo Hei-hung
Lee Hing-kwan
Got Heung-ting

Awards
1975 Golden Horse Awards
Best Actress: Lisa Lu 
Best Supporting Actress: Ivy Ling Po

See also
List of Asian historical drama films

External links

HK cinemagic entry

Hong Kong historical drama films
1975 films
Films based on actual events
1970s Mandarin-language films
Shaw Brothers Studio films
Films directed by Li Han-hsiang
Films set in 19th-century Qing dynasty
Monarchy in fiction
Cultural depictions of Empress Dowager Cixi